Dorothy Enid Wedderburn (née Barnard, formerly Cole; 18 September 1925 – 20 September 2012) was Principal of Bedford College, part of the University of London, and after the merger with Royal Holloway College, another college of the university, was the first principal of the combined institution.

Education
Wedderburn was born in Walthamstow and educated at Walthamstow County High School for Girls in north-east London and Girton College, Cambridge, where she read economics. She joined the Communist Party in the 1940s, but ended her membership of the party in the late 1950s, while remaining on the left of the labour movement.

Career

Cambridge and Imperial
She was a research officer at the Board of Trade from 1946–66, did research in applied economics at Cambridge and then worked as a lecturer, and subsequently reader and professor, in industrial sociology at the Imperial College of Science and Technology in London, then part of the University of London, from 1965–1981. At Imperial she was head of the Department of Social and Economic Studies from 1978–81.

Bedford and Royal Holloway merger
In 1981 she became Principal of Bedford College. The 1982 partnership agreement between Bedford and Royal Holloway was signed as a result of severe cuts in government spending on higher education. Discussions had taken place between Wedderburn and Holloway's then principal, Dr Lionel Butler. Before anything was finalised, Butler died suddenly on 26 November 1981. Following this, final discussions took place between Wedderburn and Dr Roy Miller, Holloway's new principal. These included Bedford leaving its site in Regent's Park, London and moving to the Holloway site. The merger finally took place in 1985 and the newly merged Royal Holloway and Bedford New College was inaugurated in 1986 by Her Majesty The Queen at a ceremony at Royal Holloway's chapel. Wedderburn was appointed as first principal of the merged college and served from 1985–1990, and was also the last principal of Bedford.

The official title (Royal Holloway and Bedford New College) is still retained, but for everyday use the college is now referred to as Royal Holloway, University of London or simply Royal Holloway, London. On leaving Royal Holloway she declined the   damehood normally offered to former female principals. There is no explanation given in any of the published obituaries.

Sale of Royal Holloway's paintings
The late 1980s were difficult times financially for universities including the new college. She closed the Chemistry Department, for which the extensive Bourne building had been constructed in the late 1960s, as chemistry had become too expensive a subject. She reduced staff across all departments and, more controversially, agreed to the sale of the three most valuable paintings in RHC's collection.

Between 1993 and 1995, a Turner ("Van Tromp going about to please his Masters, Ships at Sea, getting a good wetting" c. 1844), Constable ("A Sketch for View on the Stour, nr Dedham" c.1821/2) and Gainsborough ("Peasants going to Market: Early Morning"  c. 1770) were sold for a total of £21m. Holloway's remaining paintings were worth about £17m, but probably now substantially more.

Other posts
Wedderburn was a Pro-Vice-Chancellor of the University of London from 1986–88. From 1981–2003 she was also a senior research fellow at Imperial College. She was Honorary President of the Fawcett Society from 1986–2002. From 1998–2000, she was chair of the Committee of Enquiry into Women in Prison.

Personal life
She was married twice: to the economic historian A N "Max" Cole from whom she was divorced in 1960. From 1962 to 1968, she was married to Bill Wedderburn, Baron Wedderburn of Charlton, a union that also ended in divorce. Both marriages were childless.

Dorothy Wedderburn's brother, George, was President of the Royal Statistical Society and Institute of Mathematics and its Applications in the 1970s and Emeritus Professor of Mathematics at the University of Essex.

Publications
Wedderburn wrote extensively on social issues including White Collar Redundancy (1964), Enterprise Planning for Change (1964), The Economic Circumstances of Old People (1962) and later Justice for Women (2000).

See also
 Keith Murray, Baron Murray of Newhaven – Author of the Murray Report on London University 1972

References

1925 births
2012 deaths
People from Walthamstow
Academics of Imperial College London
Alumni of Girton College, Cambridge
People associated with Royal Holloway, University of London
Academics of Bedford College, London
People associated with Bedford College, London
People educated at Walthamstow School for Girls
Communist Party of Great Britain members
Spouses of life peers
British economists
British women economists
British women academics
Place of death missing